Hemicrepidius niger is a species of click beetle belonging to the family Elateridae.

References

Beetles described in 1758
niger
Taxa named by Carl Linnaeus